Tirucallane is a tetracyclic triterpene with the chemical formula C30H54.  It is the 20S-stereoisomer of euphane and its derivatives, such as tirucalladienol, are found in Euphorbia and other plants.

See also
 Euphane
 Apotirucallane
 Octanorapotirucallane

References

Triterpenes